Oliver Schmidt (born 1969) is an engineer, former Volkswagen AG executive and convicted felon who in 2017 was sentenced to seven years of prison due to his involvement in the Volkswagen emissions scandal.

Biography

After studying mechanical engineering in Hannover, Schmidt was employed by Volkswagen AG in Wolfsburg.

At the age of 35, Schmidt was transferred to the United States, where he from 2012 oversaw VW's emissions office in Michigan.

In January 2017 while attempting to return to Germany after a vacation, Schmidt was arrested in a men's room at a Florida airport, charged with conspiracy to defraud the United States in the Volkswagen emissions scandal. Had Schmidt been able to board a plane and return to Germany, the chances of him being prosecuted would have been slim as it is unlikely that Germany would have extradited one of its own citizens to stand trial in the United States.  In December 2017, having earlier pleaded guilty, a Federal judge in Detroit sentenced him to seven years in prison and fined him $400,000.

Schmidt was inmate number 09786-104 and was incarcerated at U.S. Federal prison FCI Milan in York Township, Michigan.  His release date was set for 25 December 2022.

In late September 2020, Schmidt was transferred to Germany where he was incarcerated at Hanover Correctional Center. In January 2021, he was released on parole after serving a bit more than half his sentence.

References

1969 births
Living people
German chief executives
Chief executives in the automobile industry
Volkswagen Group executives
21st-century German criminals
Criminals from Lower Saxony